Route 66 Film Festival is an annual film festival that takes place the first weekend of November. The film festival is located in Springfield, IL and first began in November 2002.

Background 

The festival was initially created to celebrate the vehicles and history of the famous Route 66 highway. The film festival took place during Springfield's International Route 66 Mother Road Festival but separated itself from the road festival in order to be represented as an independent event.

The Festival mission and objective is to support and recognize independent filmmakers of all ages and backgrounds. The festival focuses on the idea of journey—emotional, physical, spiritual, and personal. The films represented at the festival highlight journeys from the American West as well as from around the world. The Route 66 Film festival has presented films from all around the world. International films that have been screened at the Route 66 Film Festival include country representations from Belgium, France, South Africa, Japan, Brazil, Spain, Great Britain, Uruguay, Mexico, Canada, and the United States. Diversity is celebrated and embraced and is represented in both feature films and short films.

Festival Programmers and Staff 

The following people provide programming and support.

Film Categories 

Feature films as well as short films are sorted into nine categories. The film categories include, Animation, Comedy, Drama, Experimental, Foreign Language, Debut Film, Student Showcase, Made in Illinois, as well as Heroes and Heroines. The Student Showcase screens short films that are no more than 30 minutes in length by students who are in their 4th year of college or younger. All films are independently backed or produced by the represented school or university. Made in Illinois screens films of all genres that are specifically filmed in Illinois. The films represent Illinois filmmakers and highlight the Illinois landscape and setting. Heroes and Heroines showcase films about ordinary people doing extraordinary things, emerging as heroes and heroines as the result of their journey.

Film screenings are open to the public with the cost of admission being $10 per ticket. Audience members are asked to vote after each screening in order to unearth the winning films for each film category. Festival judges also select films for official awards. New talent has been discovered every year and some films go on to be honored at other festivals, distributed by companies such as Netflix and have even been nominated at the Academy Awards.

Awards 

The awards that were presented at the 2015 festival went to the winners of the Festival Prize, Judge's Choice, and Best Foreign Language Film.

External links
 Official site

References

Film festivals in Illinois